Pablo Andújar was the two-time defending champion but lost in the first round to fellow countryman Pablo Carreño Busta.
Tommy Robredo won the title, defeating Kevin Anderson in the final, 7–6(8–6), 4–6, 6–3.

Seeds
The top four seeds received a bye into the second round.

Draw

Finals

Top half

Bottom half

Qualifying

Seeds

Qualifiers

Draw

First qualifier

Second qualifier

Third qualifier

Fourth qualifier

References
 Main Draw
 Qualifying Draw

Singles